Pesaro Altarpiece may refer to:

Pesaro Altarpiece (Bellini), c. 1471
Pesaro Madonna, by Titian, c. 1519

See also
Frari Triptych, or Pesaro Triptych, by Bellini, c. 1488